The Anglican Diocese of Ikeduru is one of twelve within the Anglican Province of Owerri, itself one of fourteen provinces within the Church of Nigeria. It was established in 2009. Its current bishop is Emmanuel Maduwike.

References

Church of Nigeria dioceses
Dioceses of the Province of Owerri